Robert de Nesle (1906–1978) was a French film producer. He controlled the production company Comptoir Français de Productions Cinématographiques (CFPC).

Selected filmography
 The Nude Dancer (1952)
 Soyez les bienvenus (1953)
 After You Duchess (1954)
 The Count of Bragelonne (1954)
 Women's Prison (1958)
 Judex (1963)
 The Exterminators (1965)
 Trap for the Assassin (1966)
 Mexican Slayride (1967)
 Coplan Saves His Skin (1968)

References

Bibliography
 Manthia Diawara. African Cinema: Politics & Culture. Indiana University Press, 1992.

External links

1906 births
1978 deaths
French film producers
Film people from Rouen